Serua is an almost extinct Austronesian language originally spoken on Serua Island in Maluku, Indonesia. Speakers were relocated to Seram due to volcanic activity on Serua. The language continues in communities in Waipia in Seram, where the islanders were resettled, along with those also from Nila and Teun. Here, the older generation retain the island language as a strong form of identity.

At the end of WWII, many Seruans were relocated to the Netherlands. Having fought on the side of the Dutch during Indonesian independence, they became part of the KNIL resettlement. The TNS (Teun Nila Serua) groups maintain an island community in the Netherlands, but the language is not maintained.

Phrases
 – 'How are you?'

 – 'I am well'

 – 'Money'

 – 'I have no money'

 – 'whisper'

 – 'Farewell till later, I will always wait for you.'

A song of heave-ho to accompany pulling boats to shore:

References

Further reading
M. A. Chlenov and Chlenova, Svetlana. 2000. Serua, a vanishing language in Eastern Indonesia. In Nataliya F. Alieva (ed.), Malaysko-indoneziyskiye issledovaniya, XVI, 265-299. Moscow.

Languages of Indonesia
Timor–Babar languages